Moulay Yacoub (Arabic:مولاي يعقوب ) is a province in Fès-Meknès, Morocco. It had a population of 150,422 as per the 2004 census report. The capital is the spa town of Moulay Yacoub.

Subdivisions
The province is divided administratively into the following:

References
 Moulay Yacoub pictures

 
Moulay Yacoub Province